The gas-generator cycle is a power cycle of a pumped liquid bipropellant rocket engine. Part of the unburned propellant is burned in a gas generator (or preburner) and the resulting hot gas is used to power the propellant pumps before being exhausted overboard, and lost. Because of this loss, this type of engine is termed open cycle.

Usage
Gas-generator combustion engines include the following:
Vulcain, HM7B
Merlin
RS-68
RS-27A
J-2X
F-1
RD-107
CE-20

Rocket launch systems that use gas-generator combustion engines:
Ariane 5
Falcon 9, Falcon Heavy
Delta IV
Saturn V
Soyuz
Geosynchronous Satellite Launch Vehicle III
Long March 3B, Long March 2F
Rocket Lab Neutron
Miura 5

See also 

 Combustion tap-off cycle
 Expander cycle
 Pressure-fed engine
 Rocket engine
 Staged combustion cycle

References

External links 
 Rocket power cycles
 Rocket-Engine Cooling at NASA

Combustion
Rocket engines
 
Spacecraft propulsion
Thermodynamic cycles